José Mazzini (born 9 December 1909, date of death unknown) was a Peruvian cyclist. He competed in the three events at the 1936 Summer Olympics.

References

External links
 

1909 births
Year of death missing
Peruvian male cyclists
Olympic cyclists of Peru
Cyclists at the 1936 Summer Olympics
Place of birth missing
20th-century Peruvian people